Hubert Haenel (20 May 1942 – 10 August 2015) was a French politician and a member of the Senate of France. He represented the Haut-Rhin department and was a member of the Union for a Popular Movement Party.

On 24 February 2010 he was nominated to the Constitutional Council of France by the President of the French Senate Gérard Larcher.

References

External links
Page on the Senate website

1942 births
2015 deaths
French Senators of the Fifth Republic
Union for a Popular Movement politicians
Recipients of the Order of the Cross of Terra Mariana, 2nd Class
Senators of Haut-Rhin
Politicians from Grand Est
People from Meurthe-et-Moselle
French people of German descent
Commandeurs of the Légion d'honneur